Carl Adolf Hjalmar Bertilsson (18 October 1889 – 16 November 1968) was a Swedish gymnast  who competed in the 1908 Summer Olympics. He was a member of the Swedish team that won the all-around gold medal.

References

1889 births
1968 deaths
Swedish male artistic gymnasts
Gymnasts at the 1908 Summer Olympics
Olympic gymnasts of Sweden
Olympic gold medalists for Sweden
Olympic medalists in gymnastics
Medalists at the 1908 Summer Olympics